Anaxita drucei is a moth of the family Erebidae. It is found in Guatemala.

Subspecies
Anaxita drucei drucei (Guatemala)
Anaxita drucei brueckneri Seitz, 1925 (Guatemala)

References

Moths described in 1893
Phaegopterina
Moths of Central America